Sidney Nelson Onwubere (born August 1, 1993) is a Filipino-Nigerian basketball player for the Barangay Ginebra San Miguel of the Philippine Basketball Association (PBA). He is a former star player for the EAC Generals. He was selected by the Phoenix Fuel Masters in the 2017 PBA draft, but was traded to the TNT KaTropa the same day.

Early life and high school career 
Onwubere is the son of a Nigerian father and a Filipina mother. In high school, he played for the Emilio Aguinaldo Brigadiers, winning Defensive Player of the Year in the NCAA Season 87 Juniors' division, and earning a spot in the Mythical Team.

College career 
Onwubere moved up to the NCAA seniors' division, and played for the EAC Generals. In his rookie season, he was involved in a scuffle with Arellano guard James Forrester. He was given a one-game suspension. He only averaged 2.5 points, 2.8 rebounds in 10.7 minutes in 13 games in Season 89.

In Season 90, he had 15 rebounds, 10 points, and 2 blocks in a win against the Mapúa Cardinals.

In Season 91, the Generals got their first win after five games against the San Sebastian Stags, with Onwubere contributing 13 points and 14 rebounds. He was suspended one game for being involved in a parking lot altercation with players from a rival school. He led all players with 24 points and 9 rebounds in a loss to Arellano. The Generals finished dead last that season.

In Season 92, Onwubere had 18 points and 19 rebounds in a loss to the JRU Heavy Bombers. In their rematch, he led the Generals to the win with 26 points, nine rebounds, three assists, and three steals.

In Season 93, he had nine turnovers and a double-double of 11 points and 14 rebounds in a win over the CSB Blazers. In a win over Perpetual Altas, he finished with 21 points (with four being crucial free throws), 17 rebounds, three assists and a block after playing nearly 40 minutes of action in the win. He finished the first round of eliminations with averages of 14.9 points, 11.8 rebounds, 2.6 assists, and 1.9 blocks per game. In a win against the Bombers in the second round of eliminations, he had 28 points and nine rebounds. The Generals failed to make the Final Four, finishing with a 7–11 record. In his final season, Onwubere averaged 18 points, 12.4 rebounds, 2.9 assists, and 1.6 blocks, earning him a spot in the Mythical Five.

Professional career

PBA D-League 
Onwubere played for the Racal Tile Masters in the D-League. In the 2017 Aspirants' Cup, his team made it to the Finals, where they lost to the Cignal-San Beda Hawkeyes.

TNT KaTropa 
Onwubere was selected by the Phoenix Fuel Masters in the 2017 PBA draft, but was traded to the TNT KaTropa the same day along with Justin Chua for Jonjon Gabriel and Phoenix's 2019 second round pick. He debuted with six points, nine rebounds and a steal off the bench. He was traded to the Rain or Shine Elasto Painters.

Rain or Shine Elasto Painters 
Onwubere was traded along with Kris Rosales and a 2018 first-round pick in exchange for Jericho Cruz. He broke out in the 2020 PBA season, averaging 5.7 points and 3.6 rebounds in the elimination round. After that season, he was traded to the NorthPort Batang Pier.

NorthPort Batang Pier 
On January 20, 2021, Onwubere, along with Clint Doliguez, was traded to the NorthPort Batang Pier for Bradwyn Guinto. He averaged a plus/minus of 7.8, good for fourth in the league.

Barangay Ginebra San Miguel 
On November 9, 2021, Onwubere was traded to the Barangay Ginebra San Miguel for Arthur dela Cruz. He suffered a high ankle sprain in a game against the Magnolia Hotshots in the Governors' Cup, which put him out initially for the rest of the conference and the season. Despite the diagnosis, he recovered quickly enough to play again that conference.

PBA career statistics 

As of the end of 2021 season

Season-by-season averages 

|-
| align=left rowspan=2| 
| align=left | TNT
| rowspan=2|18 || rowspan=2|7.3 || rowspan=2|.371 || rowspan=2|.278 || rowspan=2|.333 || rowspan=2|1.5 || rowspan=2|.3 || rowspan=2|.6 || rowspan=2|.2 || rowspan=2|1.8
|-
| align=left | Rain or Shine
|-
| align=left | 
| align=left | Rain or Shine
| 20 || 5.0 || .278 || .167 || .313 || 1.0 || .2 || .3 || .1 || 1.4
|-
| align=left | 
| align=left | Rain or Shine
| 12 || 15.5 || .328 || .214 || .514 || 3.4 || .3 || .1 || .3 || 5.8
|-
| align=left rowspan=2| 
| align=left | NorthPort
| rowspan=2|25 || rowspan=2|18.8 || rowspan=2|.413 || rowspan=2|.263 || rowspan=2|.524 || rowspan=2|3.7 || rowspan=2|.9 || rowspan=2|.5 || rowspan=2|.5 || rowspan=2|6.4
|-
| align=left | Barangay Ginebra
|-
|-class=sortbottom
| align="center" colspan=2 | Career
| 75 || 11.8 || .372 || .240 || .480 || 2.4 || .5 || .4 || .3 || 3.9

3x3 basketball 
Onwubere was also a member of the Team Manila roster for the 2016 FIBA 3x3 All Stars in Doha, Qatar. He played with Rey Guevarra, CJ Perez and Bright Akhuetie in this competition. The team finished seventh out of eight competitors.

References

External links 
 Sidney Onwubere at PBA.ph
  at RealGM

1993 births
Living people
Barangay Ginebra San Miguel players
Basketball players from Metro Manila
EAC Generals basketball players
FIBA 3x3 World Tour players
Filipino men's 3x3 basketball players
Filipino men's basketball players
Filipino people of Nigerian descent
NorthPort Batang Pier players
People from Valenzuela, Metro Manila
Phoenix Super LPG Fuel Masters draft picks
Rain or Shine Elasto Painters players
Small forwards
TNT Tropang Giga players
Power forwards (basketball)